HKT Limited, also known as Hong Kong Telecom, is one of the largest telecommunications companies of Hong Kong. It has a dominant position in fixed-line, mobile, IDD and broadband services in Hong Kong. HKT Group is a subsidiary of PCCW since 2000, after it was acquired from Cable & Wireless plc.

The company, along with HKT Trust, is a pair of listed corporations in the Hong Kong Stock Exchange, which the two corporations were bundled as one single stapled security.

Corporate identities
The former holding company of the group was Cable & Wireless HKT Limited (former ticker symbol: 8), it was a subsidiary of Cable & Wireless plc. It was taken over and privatised by PCCW in 2000. PCCW also started to use the ticker symbol "8" after the takeover. Cable & Wireless HKT Limited was formerly known as Hong Kong Telecommunications Limited, which was incorporated in 1987; it was renamed to Cable & Wireless HKT Limited in 1999, but renamed again to PCCW-HKT Limited in 2000; PCCW-HKT still use the same registered Chinese name until 2011, which in the same year the Chinese name became the registered Chinese name of HKT Limited instead.

PCCW-HKT had a major subsidiary PCCW-HKT Telephone Limited, which was incorporated in 1925 under the name Hongkong Telephone Company, Limited; it was briefly known as Cable & Wireless HKT Telephone Limited from 1999 to 2000. , PCCW-HKT as well as PCCW-HKT Telephone were still live, wholly owned subsidiaries of PCCW. However, the telephone services is now provided by HKT's wholly owned subsidiary Hong Kong Telecommunications (HKT) Limited instead, after a group restructure in 2008.

In October 2011, PCCW shareholders approve a partial spin-off of the assets as HKT on the Hong Kong stock exchange (but excluding the two legal persons PCCW-HKT and PCCW-HKT Telephone). HKT is successfully listed on 29 November 2011, as HKT Limited and HKT Trust. HKT Limited was incorporated in the Cayman Islands, while its direct parent entity, HKT Trust, was set up in Hong Kong under the laws of Hong Kong.

History 

Domestic telecommunications facilities in Hong Kong became more advanced in 1925 when the Hong Kong Telephone Company Limited (HKTC) took over the interests of John Pender's China and Japan Telephone and Electric Company. The company's mandate included providing all the British colonies with local telephone services. Over the next six decades Hong Kong Telephone's line capacity grew to more than 2.5 million, with the company serving approximately six million people.

Telecommunications became increasingly important following World War I, and in 1929 the British companies Marconi Wireless and Eastern Telegraph joined to establish Cable & Wireless. The company's strategy was to supply telephone and telegraph services in Britain's colonies, and it succeeded in securing an exclusive franchise to provide international communications services in Hong Kong.

By 1972 the company's biggest operation was its subsidiary in rapidly growing Hong Kong. Hong Kong Telephone, meanwhile, built a new headquarters in 1972. The company's growth was said to typify the colony's transition from an economy based on manufacturing to one dependent on service industries, which created a demand for telecommunications services. In 1975 Hong Kong Telephone's franchise for domestic service in the colony was extended for an additional 20 years, to expire just ahead of Hong Kong's reversion to China's control in 1997.

Chronology

Hong Kong Telephone Company 
 1906: China and Japan Telephone and Electric Company acquired a 25-year franchised licence on fixed-line.
1925: China and Japan Telephone and Electric Company was acquired by Hong Kong Telephone Company Limited (HKTC). The government also granted HKTC a 50 years franchised licence on telephone service.
1968: HKTC's franchise was extended for another 20 years.
 1983: HKTC started to build their own mobile radiotelephone service, which was supplied and installed by NEC; in the next year the service went public under HKTC's subsidiary Communication Services Limited

Cable and Wireless (Hong Kong)

1871: The predecessor of Cable & Wireless established its Hong Kong branch, for its submarine communications cables that connect from Hong Kong to Saigon, Fuzhou, Manila, Labuan and Macau (or 1936 according to another source)
 1962: Cable & Wireless acquired a 25-year franchise for telephone and telegraph services 
1981: The Hong Kong branch of Cable & Wireless plc was incorporated as Cable and Wireless (Hong Kong) Limited (later known as Hong Kong Telecom International; HKTI). Hong Kong government was a minority shareholder for 20%.
 1983: Cable and Wireless (Hong Kong) acquired 34.8% shares of HKTC from Jardine Matheson.
1986: Cable & Wireless also announced plans for an underwater optical fibre cable connecting Hong Kong with Japan and South Korea (a part of APCN), to become operational in 1990.

Hong Kong Telecommunications
 1987: Cable & Wireless (Hong Kong) and Hong Kong Telephone Company merged to form a new telecommunications group, with the new holding company called Hong Kong Telecommunications Limited, replacing Hong Kong Telephone Company as a listed company on the stock exchange of Hong Kong and as one of the constituents of Hang Seng Index (the blue-chip index of HK). Government of Hong Kong owned around 5.5% shares of the new company immediately after the merger; Cable & Wireless plc remained as the largest shareholder.
 1990: Chinese government controlled CITIC Hong Kong acquired 20% shares of Hong Kong Telecommunications from former British state owned enterprise Cable & Wireless plc.
 1995: HKTC's franchise expired. HKTC was one of the 4 companies to receive the new licence in local fixed-line services
 1999: Hong Kong Telecommunications Limited was renamed to Cable & Wireless HKT; the subsidiaries, HKTC was renamed to Cable & Wireless HKT Telephone Limited; HKTI was renamed to Cable & Wireless HKT International.
 2000: Cable & Wireless HKT was acquired by PCCW. Cable & Wireless HKT was renamed to PCCW-HKT Limited; the subsidiary HKTC was renamed to PCCW-HKT Telephone Limited; while HKTI was renamed to PCCW-HKT International
 2001: the subsidiary HKTI was renamed to Reach Networks Hong Kong, it became a wholly owned subsidiary of Reach Limited instead, a joint venture of PCCW and Telstra; 60% stake of CSL was also sold to Telstra
 2002: the remaining stake of CSL, the only mobile network operator of the group, was sold to Telstra
 2005: PCCW-HKT takeover Sunday Communications, relaunching its mobile network operator as PCCW Mobile
 2007: PCCW-HKT Telephone acquired the licence of CDMA2000 mobile network operator, and launched the services in the next year.
 2008 to 2011: Hong Kong Telecommunications (HKT) Limited was incorporated; Moody's ceased to assign credit rating to PCCW-HKT Telephone Limited and assign a new rating to Hong Kong Telecommunications (HKT) Limited instead; it was reported that PCCW-HKT Telephone would become dormant. In the same year, some of the subsidiaries of PCCW, were transferred to an intermediate holding company HKT Group Holdings Limited (HKTGH), for example PCCW Global, PCCW Mobile, PCCW Media, PCCW Solutions, and engineering division Cascade Limited. However, PCCW re-organised HKTGH again in the eve of the 2011 IPO of HKT Limited, which some non-telecommunications businesses were spin-off from HKTGH. PCCW Media and PCCW Solutions for example, were directly owned by PCCW again. Also, HKTGH became a subsidiary of HKT Limited.

HKT Limited
 2011: PCCW made HKT Limited, c/o HKT Trust, a spin-off business that separate listing on the Hong Kong stock exchange.
 2012: HKT's PCCW Global acquired Gateway Communications, a satellite services provider
 2014: HKT re-acquired CSL (known as its holding company CSL New World Mobility) from Telstra and New World Development; CSL and PCCW Mobile merged, with CSL as the surviving brand; the brand New World Mobility of the former CSL New World Mobility Group was renamed to Sun Mobile
 2017: HKT and subsidiary PCCW Global jointly-acquired Console Connect, a provider of global interconnection solution.

HKT (Hong Kong Telecom) 

HKT Group Holdings Limited was formed in 2008 to hold the telecommunications services, media and IT businesses of the PCCW Group, a reorganization designed to improve the Group's operational efficiencies. HKT and its predecessor PCCW-HKT, was the first quadruple play provider in Hong Kong, offering media content and services for fixed-line, broadband Internet, TV and mobile. PCCW acquired HKT, at that time known as Cable & Wireless HKT, in February 2000 from Cable & Wireless.

Main business and subsidiaries

Commercial and international business
The HKT Commercial Group provides ICT services to small, medium and large enterprises. The group managed the installation of Asia's largest IP-enabled network for securities and derivatives markets, built for Hong Kong Exchanges and Clearing Limited and known as SDNet. It includes an electronic passport system, known as e-PASS, and the Smart Identity Card system for the Hong Kong SAR Government.

Netvigator 

Netvigator is a residential and commercial Internet service provider in Hong Kong, a brand of HKT Limited. It is Hong Kong's largest Internet service provider (ISP).

csl, 1O1O, Club SIM 

CSL Mobile is an HKT subsidiary, which operates mobile network brands of "csl", "1O1O" and "Club SIM" in Hong Kong. CSL, at that time incorporated as CSL New World Mobility, was re-acquired by PCCW via HKT in 2013. After the 2013 acquisition, HKT also merged PCCW Mobile HK into CSL. CSL was sold by PCCW in 2001, while PCCW Mobile HK, formerly SUNDAY, was acquired by PCCW in 2005–06.

SUN Mobile

It was a former joint venture of CSL New World Mobility and Telecom Digital. In 2013 CSL New World Mobility was acquired by PCCW via HKT Limited, from Telstra and New World Development, thus the mobile virtual network operator was re-branded as SUN Mobile.

HKT Teleservices
 HKT Teleservices, a subsidiary of HKT– formerly PCCW Teleservices, a contact centers and business process outsourcing provider, operates a contact centre outsourcing business along with an operation in the U.S. It handles inbound and outbound calls, emails and other transactions for customers.

PCCW Global
PCCW Global (formerly Beyond The Network America) is the international operating division of HKT Limited. It was owned by PCCW's sub-holding company HKT Group Holdings Limited (HKTGH) since 2008 and HKT Limited since its IPO in 2011.

PCCW Global acquired Gateway Communications in 2012 and Console Connect in 2017.

Console Connect
 Crypteia Networks

YouTube incident 
On 24 February 2008, Pakistan Telecom caused a major interruption of access to the video-sharing website YouTube. Pakistani Government authorities instructed Pakistan Telecom (PTCL) to prevent access to YouTube within Pakistan. PTCL complied by changing the BGP entry for YouTube – essentially updating its local internet address book for where YouTube's section of the internet is. The idea was to direct its internet users to a page that said YouTube was blocked. Unfortunately, the ISP announced the new route to its Internet link provider, PCCW. PCCW had recently provided temporary access to PTCL in order to restore the nation's loss of internet access due to a previous major submarine cable break event. PTCL began leaking the BGP announcement to PCCW prior to PCCW's completion of the BGP validation and filtering policies process on the newly activated link. This allowed the announcement to propagate to other networks.

Once detected, PCCW immediately blocked the leaked announcement from PTCL and access to YouTube was restored within 2 hours.

HKT Interactive Media (PCCW Media)

now TV

now TV is an IPTV and pay-TV provider in Hong Kong delivered by PCCW Media.
now TV serves Hong Kong with more than 190 channels of local, Asian and international programming, such as the English Premier League, Spanish La Liga, Italian Serie A, French Ligue 1, J-League, French Open, ATP World Tour, and World Snooker Tour. In addition, now TV is a producer of news, sports and infotainment programming and a provider of interactive services. nowTV can be viewed on its nowTV app, and select now TV content and interactive applications can also be accessed via the group's 4G mobile network and broadband service.

The Club 
a Hong Kong customer loyalty program.

HKT Payment Limited  
the developer of "Tap & Go", a prepaid mobile payment service for Hong Kong users.

Brands and services
 HKT-eye  over-the-top media services and Internet Protocol TV service delivered to firmware-modified tablet computer

PPS (Payment by Phone Service) – a bill payment service provided by HKT and EPS.

Former service
iTV, an interactive television

Cascade
PCCW announced the formation of wholly owned subsidiary Cascade Limited in late 2002 t0 2008,  It was reported that the staff were offered a wage-cut in the new contract. .The name of Cascade is removed from now on, become a part of HKT and named as "Engineering", a business unit of HKT, simply like Commercial group of PCCW. All staff in Cascade had transferred to HKT without changing.

), However, due to 2011 initial public offering of HKT Limited, some of the subsidiaries of HKTGH (which HKTGH was a wholly owned subsidiary of HKT Limited) still have use the  name cascade or pccw in their name due to law and finance reasons ,although they wholly owned subsidiaries of HKT. A namesake, Mainland China-incorporated "PCCW Cascade Technology (Guangzhou) Limited" is a wholly owned subsidiary of HKT Limited.

Controversy
In 2018, it was exposed that HKT breached the land leases for 4 of their telephone exchange buildings. They were illegally converted to customers service centers.

References

Pacific Century Group
Telecommunications companies of Hong Kong
Telecommunications companies established in 1925
1925 establishments in Hong Kong
Companies listed on the Hong Kong Stock Exchange
Former companies in the Hang Seng Index